Eugenia Aleksandrovna Maniokova (born 17 May 1968) is a retired professional tennis player from Russia. She is a former world No. 18 in doubles.

Biography
Maniokova is best known for winning the mixed doubles event at the 1993 French Open partnering Andrei Olhovskiy. In her career, she won four titles in women's doubles on the WTA Tour, and three titles in singles and 24 in women's doubles on the ITF Women's Circuit. Maniokova represented Commonwealth of Independent States at both the 1992 Summer Olympics and 1992 Federation Cup, due to the separation of the Soviet Union.

Maniokova retired after playing at the 1996 French Open.

Grand Slam finals

Mixed doubles (1 title)

WTA Tour finals

Doubles 8 (4 titles, 4 runners-up)

ITF finals

Singles (3–3)

Doubles (20–5)

Other finals

Singles (2-1)

Doubles (0-1)

Mixed (1-0)

References

External links
 
 
 

Living people
1968 births
Tennis players from Moscow
French Open champions
Russian female tennis players
Soviet female tennis players
Tennis players at the 1992 Summer Olympics
Olympic tennis players of the Unified Team
Grand Slam (tennis) champions in mixed doubles